Rhombodera keiana is a species of praying mantises in the family Mantidae, found in the Kei Islands of Indonesia.

See also
List of mantis genera and species

References

K
Mantodea of Asia
Insects described in 1912